Visit filters which are used by Web log analysis software include or exclude all the data in a visit session. The specifying ranges or types of data let you limit the web log data that is analyzed, letting you focus on relevant activity.

See also
 Hit filter

References

Web analytics